Aegiochus is a genus of isopods in the family Aegidae, first described in 1885 by Carl Bovallius. The type species is Aega ventrosa.

Species
Species accepted by WoRMS are:
Aegiochus antarctica 
Aegiochus arctica 
Aegiochus australis 
Aegiochus beri 
Aegiochus bertrandi 
Aegiochus coroo 
Aegiochus crozetensis 
Aegiochus cyclops 
Aegiochus dentata 
Aegiochus dollfusi 
Aegiochus francoisae 
Aegiochus glacialis 
Aegiochus gordoni 
Aegiochus gracilipes 
Aegiochus incisa 
Aegiochus insomnis 
Aegiochus kakai 
Aegiochus kanohi 
Aegiochus laevis 
Aegiochus leptonica 
Aegiochus longicornis 
Aegiochus nohinohi 
Aegiochus perulis 
Aegiochus piihuka 
Aegiochus plebeia 
Aegiochus pushkini 
Aegiochus quadratasinus 
Aegiochus riwha 
Aegiochus sarsae 
Aegiochus spongiophila 
Aegiochus symmetrica 
Aegiochus synopthalma 
Aegiochus tenuipes 
Aegiochus tumida 
Aegiochus uschakovi 
Aegiochus ventrosa 
Aegiochus vigilans 
Aegiochus weberi

References

Cymothoida
Crustaceans described in 1885